Skalnik Gracze is a football club based in Gracze, Poland. It was founded in 1953. As of 2016/17 season they are playing in the IV liga, at the 5th level of Polish football.

References

Football clubs in Poland
Association football clubs established in 1953
1953 establishments in Poland
Opole County
Football clubs in Opole Voivodeship